In sumo wrestling, a kanreki dohyō-iri (Japanese: 還暦土俵入り) is a ring-entering ceremony (dohyō-iri) performed by a former yokozuna in celebration of his 60th birthday (called kanreki in Japanese). If he is a toshiyori (a sumo elder), the ceremony is usually held at the Ryōgoku Kokugikan, the main sumo hall in Tokyo. Those who are not current members of the Japan Sumo Association must hold it at another location. A special red tsuna is created and worn, instead of the usual white tsuna. Reaching your 60th birthday is an important occasion in Japan and is celebrated by wearing a red item. This is commonly known as an akatsuna (赤綱) but this term is unofficial. If the dew-sweeper or sword-bearer is a former yokozuna, he wears his own tsuna.

Kanreki performed at Kokugikan

Wrestlers are listed using their ring name, followed by their then toshiyori name in brackets if they were retired at the time of the ceremony.

Kanreki performed at other locations

Tachiyama's was the first kanreki-dohyo-iri and the only one to use the shiranui style until Asahifuji's in 2021. Mienoumi performed an early kanreki dohyō-iri seven months before his 60th birthday, on the 25th anniversary of the founding of Musashigawa stable.

Other eligible Yokozuna
Minanogawa Tōzō, Akinoumi Setsuo and Hiroshi Wajima also reached the age of sixty years whilst retired, but did not perform a kanreki dohyō-iri (all three had left the sumo world many years before). Kagamisato Kiyoji (Tatsutagawa), Tochinoumi Teruyoshi (Kasugano), Sadanoyama Shinmatsu (Sakaigawa) and Kotozakura Masakatsu (Sadogatake) received red tsuna but did not perform dohyō-iri. Kagamisato and Kotozakura did not perform due to poor health. Similarly Tochinoumi did not perform due to muscle problems in his right arm dating back to his active days. Sadanoyama declined because at the time he had just lost the chairmanship of the Sumo Association in controversial circumstances. Asashio Tarō (Takasago) had a red tsuna made, but died aged 58 without performing the ceremony.

Asahifuji was scheduled to perform the kanreki ceremony on 30 May 2020 but the event was postponed owing to the COVID-19 Pandemic. It was eventually held on 3 October 2021 at the Kokugikan.

Ōnokuni Yasushi reached 60 years of age in October of 2022, however, no plans for a dohyō-iri were reported.

See also
List of yokozuna

References

External links
Article with images of kanreki dohyō-iri (Japanese)

Sumo terminology